Oak Valley Township is a township in Elk County, Kansas, USA.  As of the 2000 census, its population was 154.

Geography
According to the USGS, it contains one cemetery, Oak Valley.

The streams of Bachelor Creek, Bloody Run, Hickory Creek, Little Hickory Creek, Mid Painterhood Creek and Painterhood Creek run through this township.

References
 USGS Geographic Names Information System (GNIS)

External links
 US-Counties.com
 City-Data.com

Townships in Elk County, Kansas
Townships in Kansas